Eleodes carbonaria is a species of desert stink beetle in the family Tenebrionidae.

Subspecies
These subspecies belong to the species Eleodes carbonaria:
 Eleodes carbonaria chihuahuaensis Champion, 1884
 Eleodes carbonaria obsoleta Say, 1824
 Eleodes carbonaria omissa LeConte, 1858

References

Further reading

External links

 

Tenebrionidae